Trilokanathar Temple, Irumpudhalai, is a Siva temple in Kumbakonam-Papanasam-Thirukkarugavur-Saliyamangalam road at a distance of 5 km from Thirukkarugavur in Thanjavur District in Tamil Nadu (India).

Vaippu Sthalam
It is one of the shrines of the Vaippu Sthalams sung by Tamil Saivite Nayanar Appar.

Presiding deity
The presiding deity is known as Trilokanathar. His consort is known as Trilokanayagi.

Shrines
In the right side shrine of goddess is found. Varaki, Saturn,  Gnanasambandar, Bairava and Surya are also found. In the kosta Dakshinamurthy, Vishnu and Durga are found.

References

External links
 மூவர் தேவார வைப்புத்தலங்கள்,  irumpudhal, Sl.No.31 of 139 temples
 Shiva Temples, தேவார வைப்புத்தலங்கள், இரும்புதல், Sl.No.18 of 133 temples, page1

Hindu temples in Thanjavur district